Isla Todos Santos is a pair of islands about  off Ensenada, Baja California, at  best known for surfing.  Access is only by boat, which can be rented in Ensenada, or La Bufadora. The waves off the smallest island are among the biggest in North America. There are no facilities on the islands except for two lighthouses and a fish farm operation.

Fauna
The islands are (or were) home to Aimophila ruficeps sanctorum, an endemic subspecies of the Rufous-crowned sparrow, which is probably extinct.  It was previously home to Anthony's woodrat, which is now extinct. It is home to a critically endangered subspecies, the Todos Santos Island Kingsnake, of the California mountain kingsnake. The type species of the fish genus Bajacalifornia, Bajacalifornia burragei, was discovered during the USS Albatross deep sea expedition off the coast of Todos Santos Bay in 1911.

References

 Szabo, Khwaja, Garnett, Butchart (2012). Global Patterns and Drivers of Avian Extinctions at the Species and Subspecies Level. PLoS One

Landmarks in Ensenada
Tourist attractions in Ensenada, Baja California
Islands of Ensenada Municipality
Islands of Baja California
Uninhabited islands of Mexico